Courtney Ramey (born October 2, 1999) is an American college basketball player for the Arizona Wildcats of the Pac-12 Conference.

High school career
Ramey played basketball for Webster Groves High School in Webster Groves, Missouri. As a junior, he averaged 20 points, eight rebounds and six assists per game, leading his team to the Class 5 state championship. He was named St. Louis Post-Dispatch Player of the Year. In his senior season, Ramey averaged 22 points, seven rebounds and seven assists per game, winning his second straight Class 5 state title and sharing St. Louis Post-Dispatch Player of the Year with E. J. Liddell. He left as his school's all-time leader in points and assists. He earned Mr. Show-Me Basketball honors as the top high school player in Missouri. Ramey originally committed to playing college basketball for Louisville but reopened his recruitment after an FBI investigation involving the program. He later committed to Texas over offers from Louisville, Missouri and Oklahoma State.

College career

As a freshman at Texas, Ramey was praised by head coach Shaka Smart for his impact on both ends of the floor. He averaged 8.1 points, 3.3 rebounds and 3.1 assists per game, helping his team win the 2019 National Invitation Tournament. On February 9, 2019, Ramey recorded a sophomore season-high 25 points, six rebounds and five steals in a 70–59 win over Kansas State. As a sophomore, he averaged 10.9 points, 3.9 rebounds and 2.9 assists per game and was named to the All-Big 12 honorable mention. On January 2, 2021, Ramey scored 18 points to help upset third-ranked Kansas, 84–59. As a junior, he averaged 12.2 points, 3.2 rebounds and 3.9 assists per game, earning Third Team All-Big 12 honors. Following the season, he declared for the 2021 NBA draft while maintaining his college eligibility.

Career statistics

College

|-
| style="text-align:left;"| 2018–19
| style="text-align:left;"| Texas
| 37 || 20 || 25.5 || .385 || .386 || .588 || 3.3 || 3.1 || .9 || .2 || 8.1
|-
| style="text-align:left;"| 2019–20
| style="text-align:left;"| Texas
| 31 || 28 || 31.5 || .401 || .313 || .709 || 3.9 || 2.9 || 1.0 || .1 || 10.9
|-
| style="text-align:left;"| 2020–21
| style="text-align:left;"| Texas
| 26 || 26 || 33.5 || .383 || .414 || .831 || 3.2 || 3.9 || 1.0 || .1 || 12.2
|-
| style="text-align:left;"| 2021–22
| style="text-align:left;"| Texas
| 34 || 32 || 30.1 || .397 || .350 || .765 || 3.5 || 1.6 || 1.0 || .2 || 9.4
|- class="sortbottom"
| style="text-align:center;" colspan="2"| Career
|| 128 || 106 || 29.8 || .392 || .365 || .737 || 3.5 || 2.8 || 1.0 || .1 || 10.0

Personal life
Ramey wears the number 3 jersey to honor three people close to him who died during his childhood: his grandmother, his mother and his best friend, Alvin. He was coached by his father, Terrell, on his Amateur Athletic Union team.

References

External links
Texas Longhorns bio

1999 births
Living people
21st-century African-American sportspeople
African-American basketball players
American men's basketball players
Basketball players from St. Louis
Point guards
Texas Longhorns men's basketball players
Webster Groves High School alumni